Francis Jardine Wallace (10 May 1909 – 1994) was a Scottish professional footballer who made 43 appearances in the English Football League playing as an inside left for Darlington. He also played non-league football for clubs including Tunbridge Wells Rangers, Folkestone and Ramsgate.

Life and career
Francis Jardine Wallace was born on 10 May 1909 in Dumfries, Scotland.

Wallace signed amateur forms with Football League Third Division North club Darlington in August 1927. He initially played for Darlington's reserve team in the North-Eastern League, and was selected for the Durham County Football Association's Amateur XI to face their Northumberland counterparts in January 1928. Wallace made his Football League debut on 16 April 1928, replacing Harry Lees at inside left for a 4–1 win at home to Nelson; he was reported to "[have given] a good display", and kept his place for the next match, after which Lees returned to the side.

He was caught up in the 1928 illegal payments crisis, in which several hundred players registered as amateurs to clubs under the auspices of the Durham Association, 24 of whom were on Darlington's books, were suspended and deemed professional for receiving "tea money"payments, often very small, over and above reimbursement of the minimal legitimate expenses allowed. He returned to the team in late December 1928, scored against South Shields, and finished the season with two goals from 11 matches. The arrival of Fred Laycock meant Wallace played little the following season, but Laycock moved on, and Wallace began the 1930–31 campaign in the league team. After the team started badlythe Sunday Sun commented on how their third successive home defeat "once more served to demonstrate the unfortunate weakness of the home forward line, for on repeated occasions they blundered and spoiled glorious opportunities"he lost his place to Reg Siddle, but regained it in December and played out the rest of the season for 26 appearances and five goals. He was reported to be of interest to First Division clubs at a fee of £2,000, and took the eye of the Northern Daily Mail reporter T.F., who described him as "a great provider. A tap here, a gentle push there, a wide sweeping cross-field pass making for rapid progress, and plenty of bustle to help him along." Wallace was placed on Darlington's retained list, but he refused the terms offered for a further season, and eventually the League agreed to his being made open to transfer. 

In July 1931, Wallace signed for Tunbridge Wells Rangers, newly admitted to the Southern League Eastern Division as Kent League champions, for a fee of £1,500. He played regularly for the next two seasonstaking time out in May 1932 to marry Netta Alice Beale at St Barnabas Church, Tunbridge Wellsbut then became one of numerous players to leave the club because it could not afford to pay summer wages. Rumours linked him with Wigan Athletic, but instead he joined another Kent-based Southern League club, Folkestone. At the end of the 1933–34 season, there was interest from Football League Second Division club Barnsley and, more locally, Gillingham of the Third Division South, in a player described in the Folkestone Herald as "undoubtedly one of the cleverest footballers Folkestone has ever had", but nothing came of it, and he joined Ramsgate of the Kent League. In his first season, he scored eight goals and was named as one of the two most consistent players in the team, and he signed on for a second.

Wallace died in January 1994 at the age of 84; his death was registered in the Bromley district.

Career statistics

Notes

Sources

References

1909 births
1994 deaths
Footballers from Dumfries
Scottish footballers
Association football inside forwards
Darlington F.C. players
Tunbridge Wells F.C. players
Folkestone F.C. players
Ramsgate F.C. players
English Football League players
Southern Football League players
Place of death missing